The Flavo-1 RNA motif is a conserved RNA structure that was identified by bioinformatics. The vast majority of Flavo-1 RNAs are found in Flavobacteria, but some were detected in the phylum Bacteroidota, which contains Flavobacteria, or the phylum Spirochaetota, which is evolutionarily related to Bacteroidota. It was presumed that Flavo-1 RNAs function as non-coding RNAs.

See also
Acido-Lenti-1 RNA motif
Bacteroidales-1 RNA motif
Collinsella-1 RNA motif
Chloroflexi-1 RNA motif

References

External links
 

Non-coding RNA